D3, D03, D.III, D III or D-3 may refer to:

Transportation

Roads
 London Buses route D3, a Transport for London contracted bus route
 D3 motorway (Czech Republic), a motorway in the Czech Republic
 D3 road (Croatia), a state road in Croatia
 D3 motorway (Slovakia), a motorway in northern Slovakia

Aircraft
 Albatros D.III, a 1916 German biplane fighter aircraft
 Dewoitine D.3, a Dewoitine aircraft
 Dunne D.3, a British Dunne aircraft
 Fokker D.III, a 1916 German single-seat fighter aircraft
 Mercedes D.III, a 1914 German 6-cylinder, liquid-cooled inline aircraft engine
 Phönix D.III, a variant of the Austro-Hungarian First World War Phönix D.I biplane fighter
 Pfalz D.III, a 1917 German fighter aircraft
 Schütte-Lanz D.III, a 1918 German fighter aircraft prototype 
 Siemens-Schuckert D.III, a 1917 German prototype single-seat fighter aircraft

Automobiles
 Ford D3 platform, a full-size car automobile platform
Peugeot D3, a panel van manufactured from 1950 to 1955

Locomotives
 Bavarian D III, an 1897 steam locomotive model
 LB&SCR D3 class, an 1893 British 0-4-4 tank locomotive design
 GS&WR Class D3, a Great Southern and Western Railway Irish steam locomotive
 GNR Class D3, which was also classified D3 during LNER ownership 
 Pennsylvania Railroad class D3, an 1869 American steam locomotive model

Ships
 HMS Icarus (D03), a 1936 British Royal Navy destroyer
 HMS Ranee (D03), a 1943 British Royal Navy escort aircraft carrier
 USS D-3 (SS-19), a 1910 US Navy submarine

Science and technology
 Dihedral group of order 6 (D3)
 D-brane, a class of p-branes in theoretical physics
 D-3 (video), an uncompressed composite digital video tape format
 Nikon D3, a professional-level digital SLR camera

Biology and medicine
 ATC code D03 Preparations for treatment of wounds and ulcers, a subgroup of the Anatomical Therapeutic Chemical Classification System
 Dopamine receptor D3, a human gene
 Vitamin D3 (cholecalciferol), a type of Vitamin D
 Melanoma in situ (ICD-10 code: D03)
 Iodothyronine deiodinase type III

Computing
 d3.js, Data Driven Documents, a JavaScript library for live web graphics based on changing data
 D3, a Pick database sold by Rocket Software
 DOCSIS 3, a cable modem standard

Entertainment
 D3 Digivice, a device from the fictional anime/manga Digimon series
 D3 (Tenchi Muyo! Ryo-Ohki), a character in the anime Tenchi Muyo!
 D3: The Mighty Ducks, the third film in The Mighty Ducks trilogy
 Dedication 3, a Lil' Wayne and Young Money mixtape
 Dhoom 3, a 2013 Bollywood action movie

Video games
 Descent 3, a 1999 computer game
 Diablo III, a 2012 action role-playing game PC game by Blizzard Entertainment
 Dirt 3, a 2011 rallying video game
 Disciples III: Renaissance, a 2009 video game
 Disgaea 3, a 2008/2011 game in the Disgaea series
 Doom 3, a 2004 sci-fi horror first-person shooter computer game
 Driver 3, a 2004 racing, shooting, and adventure video game

Organizations
 D3 Publisher, a Japanese video game publisher
 Daallo Airlines, (IATA airline code), an airline based in Dubai

Other uses
 Dublin 3, a Dublin, Ireland postal district
 NCAA Division III, in American collegiate athletics
 USL League One, in American professional soccer, sometimes referred to as USL D3
 d3, a three-sided die in tabletop gaming
 d3, Mieses Opening in chess
 Voiced palato-alveolar affricate (former IPA symbol dʒ), a type of consonantal sound
Triple D, a term given to King Dedede given by the Nightmare Enterprise Salesman in the anime "Kirby: Right Back at Ya!"

See also
 King Dedede, a character in the Kirby video game series
 3D (disambiguation)
 DDD (disambiguation)
 d͡ʒ, the voiced postalveolar affricate in IPA